The 1949–50 season was the 51st season of competitive league football in the history of English football club Wolverhampton Wanderers. They played in the top tier of the English football system, the Football League First Division. The team finished as runners-up for a third time, losing out on a first league title to Portsmouth by virtue of goal average.

Results

Final League Table

Pld = Matches played; W = Matches won; D = Matches drawn; L = Matches lost; F = Goals for; A = Goals against; GA = Goal average; Pts = Points

First Division

FA Cup

Players Used

Top scorer

Most appearances

First Division Results by round

1949–50
Wolverhampton Wanderers F.C.